Vazesh is an Australian improvising jazz trio made up of Hamed Sadeghi, Jeremy Rose and Lloyd Swanton. Their album, The Sacred Key, was nominated for the 2021 ARIA Music Award for Best Jazz Album.

Members
Hamed Sadeghi - tar
Jeremy Rose - bass clarinet, soprano and tenor saxophones
Lloyd Swanton - double bass

Discography
The Sacred Key (2021) - Earshift Music / The Planet Company

References

Australian jazz ensembles